George Ramsay Acland Mills (1 October 1896 – 8 December 1972) was a British preparatory schoolmaster and an author of children's adventure stories.  His whimsical tales often revolve around boys' preparatory schools in Great Britain and often involve sports like cricket, pranks, and mysteries, as well as a beloved pet bulldog, Uggles. He was born in Bude, Cornwall and died in Devonshire.

Career as an author
Mills is listed in the British Library as a "Writer of Tales for Boys".

Books authored by Mills on the shelves of the British Library include Meredith and Co.: The Story of a Modern Preparatory School [1933], King Willow [1938], Minor and Major [1939], and St. Thomas of Canterbury [1939].  Although Mills never published another book after 1939, he saw his work reprinted for another generation into the late 1950s.

Mills' most famous book, Meredith and Co., captured the idiom of pupils during the interwar period more accurately than any other novel.  Five years later, Mills published a sequel, King Willow.  The books followed the maturation and adventures of a cadre of fun-loving boys in fictional Leadham House Preparatory School.  Leadham House was based on the teaching experiences of Mills while on the staff at Windlesham House School in Portslade and Warren Hill School in Meads, both in East Sussex, between 1925 and 1933.

Education, teaching and military
Mills also taught at The Craig School in Windermere, the English Preparatory School in Glion, and Eaton Gate Preparatory School in London between 1926 and 1938, and at Ladycross School, a Catholic boys' preparatory school in Seaford, East Sussex in 1956 (pictured).

Mills had fought in World War I from 1916 to 1919, beginning as a Private in a Rifle Brigade, transferring to the Royal Army Service Corps, and being discharged as a Lance Corporal.  At the outset of the World War II, Mills returned to military service on 11 October 1940 and was assigned the rank of Lieutenant as a paymaster in the Royal Army Pay Corps.  He was promoted to Second Lieutenant on 11 April 1942, three months after the death of his wife, Vera.  On 3 November 1943, Mills relinquished his commission due to ill health and was granted the honorary rank of Lieutenant.

Mills attended Harrow School from 1910 to 1912, after receiving his early education at Parkfield in Haywards Heath.  After the First World War, Mills took advantage of a 9 March 1920 decree of the University of Oxford, which stipulated that, until the end of Trinity Term 1923, any member of the University who had been engaged in military service for twelve months or more before his matriculation, was permitted to offer himself for examination in any Final Honours School, despite not having met the statutory conditions for admission to that School.  He had entered Christ Church, Oxford in 1919, and then the University in May 1921.

There is no record of Mills having passed any examination in the Final Honours School, or having earned a degree at Oxford.

Family
Mills married Vera Louise Beauclerk (1893–1942) on 24 April 1925. They had no children.

Mills was the great-grandson of Sir Thomas Dyke Acland, 10th Baronet of Killerton, Devon.  He was the grandson of Arthur Mills (MP) representing Taunton and Exeter, and George Dalhousie Ramsay, K.C.B., who spent thirty years as the Director of Army Clothing at the Royal Army Clothing Depot in Pimlico (1863–1893), and the second son of Revd Barton R. V. Mills, a cleric and scholar who was an authority on the works of St. Bernard of Clairvaux.  Mills was the half-brother of crime and adventure novelist Arthur F. H. Mills, and brother-in-law of Lady Dorothy Mills, the renowned author, explorer, and adventurer.

Mills lived in semi-retirement at Grey Friars in Budleigh Salterton, Devon, with his spinster sisters Agnes Edith and Violet Eleanor Mills. He died in hospital on 8 December 1972.

Bibliography

References

External links

 Who Is George Mills?

English children's writers
1896 births
1972 deaths
People educated at Harrow School
Alumni of Christ Church, Oxford
People from Bude
British Army personnel of World War I
Rifle Brigade soldiers
Royal Army Service Corps soldiers
British Army personnel of World War II
Royal Army Pay Corps officers